The crested fireback (Lophura ignita) is a medium-sized, up to 70 cm long, forest pheasant with a peacock-like dark crest, bluish black plumage, reddish brown rump, black outer tail feathers, red iris and bare blue facial skin. The female is a brown bird with short crest, blue facial skin and spotted black-and-white below.

The crested fireback is found in lowland forests of the Thai-Malay Peninsula, Borneo and Sumatra. There are four subspecies of the crested fireback, but in 2014 the subspecies rufa was split as a distinct species from the others. Males of the subspecies from Borneo and Bangka Island, L. i. ignita (lesser Bornean crested fireback) and L. i. nobilis (greater Bornean crested fireback), have brown central tail feathers, whitish legs and are rufous below. The male Vieillot's crested fireback, L. rufa, of the Thai-Malay Peninsula and most of Sumatra has white central tail feathers, red legs and bluish black streaked white below. The final subspecies, Delacour's crested fireback, L. i. macartneyi, is found in south-eastern Sumatra and the male has white to the tail, whitish legs and a variable amount of rufous below. As macartneyi specimens are variable, the Handbook of Birds of the World regards it as a hybrid between rufa and a possible relictual or introduced population of ignita. The female of L. i ignita and L. i. nobilis have a dark, blackish tail and whitish legs, while female of L. i.a rufa has a chestnut brown tail and red legs. Clements and the IUCN has split into both species while the IOC has left all subspecies intact.

The diet consists mainly of plants, fruits and small animals. The female usually lays between four and eight creamy white eggs.

Due to ongoing habitat loss and overhunting in some areas, the crested fireback is evaluated as Vulnerable on the IUCN Red List of Threatened Species. It is listed on Appendix III of CITES in Malaysia.

References

External links 
 BirdLife Species Factsheet 
 gbwf.org - Crested Fireback
 Red Data Book

crested fireback
Birds of Myanmar
Birds of Thailand
Birds of Malesia
crested fireback